The 2016 Asian Men's Junior Handball Championship is the 15th edition of the Asian Men's Junior Handball Championship held from 22 July to 1 August 2016 at Amman, Jordan under the aegis of Asian Handball Federation. It also acts as the qualification tournament for the 2017 Men's Junior World Handball Championship.

Draw

United Arab Emirates withdrew from the tournament after the draw took place.

Preliminary round

Group A

Group B

Group C

Group D

Placement Round
Team were seeded according to their results in preliminary groups.

Main Round
Team were seeded according to their result of preliminary group matches.

Group I

Group II

Knockout stage

Seventh place game

Fifth place game

Semifinals

Third place game

Final

Final standings

References

External links
AHF Report

Handball
Asia
Asian Handball Championships
2016 in Jordanian sport
Sports competitions in Amman